The 2005 FINA Women's Water Polo World League was the second edition of the annual event, organised by the world's governing body in aquatics, the FINA. Two qualification tournaments were held, before the Super Finals took off in Kirishi, Russia from August 18 to August 21, 2005.

Preliminary round

GROUP A
Held from June 29 to July 10, 2005 in the La Jolla Coggan Family Aquatic Complex in La Jolla, United States and the Aquatic Center of Eisenhower Park on Long Island, New York.

Thursday June 30, 2005 in La Jolla 

Friday July 1, 2005 in La Jolla 

Saturday July 2, 2005 in La Jolla 

Saturday July 2, 2005 in La Jolla 

Sunday July 3, 2005 in La Jolla 

Wednesday July 6, 2005 on Long Island

Thursday July 7, 2005 on Long Island

Friday July 8, 2005 on Long Island

Saturday July 9, 2005 on Long Island

Sunday July 10, 2005 on Long Island

GROUP B
Held from June 29 to July 10, 2005

Super Finals
Held from August 18 to August 21, 2005 in Kirishi, Russia
August 18, 2005

August 19, 2005

August 20, 2005

Play-offs
August 21, 2005

Final ranking

Final ranking

Individual awards
Most Valuable Player

Best Goalkeeper

Statistics
Total goals: 1220
Total matches: 76
Goals per match: 16.0
Total of scorers: 155

References

 FINA
Sports123

FINA Women's Water Polo World League
W
W
International water polo competitions hosted by Russia